Lithium oxalate is an inorganic compound, a salt of lithium metal and oxalic acid with the chemical formula . Lithium oxalate is soluble in water and converts to the oxide when heated.

Synthesis
One of the methods of synthesis is the reaction of direct neutralization of oxalic acid with lithium hydroxide:

Properties
The compound crystallizes in the monoclinic system, cell parameters a = 3.400, b = 5.156, c = 9.055 Å, β = 95.60°, Z = 4.

Lithium oxalate decomposes when heated:

Applications
In pyrotechnics, the compound is used to color the flame red.

References

Inorganic compounds
Lithium salts
Oxalates